Plocamopherus pilatectus is a species of sea slug, a nudibranch, a shell-less marine gastropod mollusk in the family Polyceridae.

Distribution 
This species was described from the Grenadines. It has subsequently been reported from nearby islands in the Caribbean Sea.

References

Hamann, J. C. and W. M. Farmer. 1988. Two new species of Plocamopherus from the western warm water Atlantic. The Veliger, 31 68-74.

External links 
 http://www.malacolog.org/search.php?nameid=8706 Malacolog Version 4.1.1 A Database of Western Atlantic Marine Mollusca

Polyceridae
Gastropods described in 1988